The Kingsway Tunnel (or Wallasey Tunnel) is a toll road tunnel under the River Mersey between Liverpool and Wallasey. The  tunnel carries the A59. It was built because the Queensway Tunnel – which was built in the 1930s to carry vehicles between Birkenhead and Liverpool – was unable to cope with the rise in postwar traffic.

History
Annual vehicle usage of the Queensway Tunnel had exceeded 11 million by 1959, causing severe traffic congestion at peak commute times, partially as a result of low toll costs. It was evident that a significant capacity increase was required, with considerations on various bridge and tunnel schemes ultimately concluding with a second tunnel as the favoured option, funded by tolls. In 1965, parliamentary powers granted construction of a new two-lane tunnel, approximately 1 mile downstream from the existing tunnel. A further bill for the tunnel's construction was promoted in 1967 with approval given in 1968, upon which construction started immediately.

Construction
The project was authorised by the Mersey Tunnel (Liverpool/Wallasey) etc. Act 1965. Edmund Nuttall Limited. Construction took around five years to fully complete. The approach to the tunnel on the Wirral side uses the former railway cutting that carried the Seacombe branch line. It was officially opened by Queen Elizabeth II on 24 June 1971. At first, only the southernmost tunnel was open for traffic, one lane in each direction. The northernmost tunnel was completed in 1974 and opened to traffic on 13 February 1974.

Operations
Kingsway comprises identical twin tunnels. Each has two  lanes. They carry on average 45,000 vehicles a day (almost 16.4million per year). , a single car journey through the tunnel cost £2. Staffed and automatic tollbooths are located on the Wallasey side. Of the two tunnels crossing the River Mersey, Kingsway is the only one able to take heavy goods vehicles (HGVs).

In a study following the fire in the Mont Blanc Tunnel in 1999, inspectors from the European Union rated the Kingsway Tunnel as "good", one of fourteen to receive that rating in Europe.

Over  of wiring was installed in the tunnel as part of a 2016 upgrade to the lighting, which saw the tunnel fitted with more energy efficient and longer-lasting LED lights.

See also
 Mersey Tunnels Police

References

External links

Transport in Liverpool
Transport in Merseyside
Toll tunnels in the United Kingdom
Road tunnels in England
Tunnels completed in 1971
Tunnels in Merseyside
Tunnels in Liverpool